is a team by a top athlete of snowboard skiing  established in September, 2004. It participates about the Olympics and the FIS World Cup, and it aims at a high-ranking winning a prize in the national constitution etc. The camp by the belonging top athlete has been held for a base expansion and the regional sports promotion as the team.

See also
Albirex Niigata
Albirex Niigata FC (Singapore)
Niigata Albirex BB
Albirex Cheerleaders
Niigata Albirex Running Club
Niigata Albirex Baseball Club

External link 
  Niigata Albirex BB Official Website

Albirex Niigata
2004 establishments in Japan